Samarin is a Russian masculine surname. Its feminine counterpart is Samarina. It may refer to
Alexander Samarin (born 1998), Russian figure skater
Ivan Samarin (racing driver) (born 1988), Russian racing driver
Ivan Samarin (actor) (1817–1885), Russian stage actor, theatre director and playwright
 Vladimir Samarin (1913–1992), Russian Axis collaborator, journalist, writer, researcher and educator
William J. Samarin (1926–2020), professor of linguistics at the University of Toronto
Yelena Samarina (1933–2011), Russian-born Spanish actress
Yuri Samarin (1819–1876), Russian Slavophile

Russian-language surnames